Maverick Banes (born 10 April 1992) is an inactive Australian tennis player.

Banes has a career high ATP singles ranking of 216 achieved on 27 August 2018. He also has a career high doubles ranking of 236 achieved on 9 May 2016.

Banes has won 1 ATP Challenger singles title at the 2018 Gwangju Open.

Challenger and Futures finals

Singles: 17 (8–9)

Doubles: 26 (12–14)

External links
 
 

1992 births
Living people
Australian male tennis players
Tennis people from the Gold Coast
21st-century Australian people